Álvaro Esteban Villalón Fernández (born 1 October 1984) is a Chilean former footballer who played as a midfielder. Besides Chile, he played in Mexico.

Career
A product of Everton de Viña del Mar youth system, Villalón played for San Luis de Quillota in 2003, winning the league title of the Chilean Tercera División and getting the promotion to the Primera B, alongside players such as Humberto Suazo, Felipe Salinas and Patricio Pérez. He also played for Unión La Calera in 2005. 

In the second half of 2007, he moved abroad and had a stint with Mexican side Lobos BUAP, with his compatriot Jorge Aravena as coach.

After leaving Everton, his last club was San Luis de Quillota in the 2008 season.

After football
He has worked as fitness coach for the youth system of San Luis de Quillota alongside former players such as Alexis Flores and Mario Pierani.

References

External links
 
 Álvaro Villalón at ESPN

1984 births
Living people
People from Valparaíso Province
Chilean footballers
Chilean expatriate footballers
Everton de Viña del Mar footballers
San Luis de Quillota footballers
Unión La Calera footballers
Lobos BUAP footballers
Chilean Primera División players
Primera B de Chile players
Tercera División de Chile players
Ascenso MX players
Chilean expatriate sportspeople in Mexico
Expatriate footballers in Mexico
Association football midfielders